(born June 24, 1980) is a Japanese cross-country skier who has competed since 1999. Competing in two Winter Olympics, he earned his best finish of 12th in the team sprint event at Turin in 2006 while his best individual finish was 17th in the individual sprint event at Vancouver four years later.

Onda's best finish at the FIS Nordic World Ski Championships was tenth twice both in the team sprint (2007, 2009) while his best individual finish was 25th in the individual sprint event at Sapporo in 2007.

His best World Cup finish was fourth twice both in individual sprint events (2007, 2009).

References

1980 births
Cross-country skiers at the 2006 Winter Olympics
Cross-country skiers at the 2010 Winter Olympics
Cross-country skiers at the 2014 Winter Olympics
Living people
Japanese male cross-country skiers
Olympic cross-country skiers of Japan
Cross-country skiers at the 2007 Asian Winter Games
Cross-country skiers at the 2011 Asian Winter Games
Asian Games medalists in cross-country skiing
Asian Games gold medalists for Japan
Asian Games silver medalists for Japan
Asian Games bronze medalists for Japan
Medalists at the 2007 Asian Winter Games
Medalists at the 2011 Asian Winter Games
Universiade medalists in cross-country skiing
Universiade bronze medalists for Japan
Competitors at the 2003 Winter Universiade
21st-century Japanese people